Joliane L. Melançon (born 22 March 1986 in Blainville, Québec) is a judoka from Canada.

Joliane was born in Blainville, a suburb of Montreal. She began with judo at age 8. She had to choose between judo and violin. She has always been more interested in sport so she chose judo. Now she trains in Club de judo de Varennes under Denis Mechin. She studies physical education at UQAM.

In 2009, she competed at 2009 World Judo Championships in Rotterdam. She lost close match with Polish judoka Małgorzata Bielak.
She won bronze medal at Pan American Judo Championships in 2009 and 2010.
She won bronze for Canada at the 2011 Pan American Judo Championships.
She represented Canada at the 2012 London Olympics in the <57 kg category

See also
Judo in Quebec
Judo in Canada
List of Canadian judoka

References

External links
 
 
 

Living people
Sportspeople from Quebec
1986 births
Canadian female judoka
People from Blainville, Quebec
Judoka at the 2011 Pan American Games
Judoka at the 2012 Summer Olympics
Olympic judoka of Canada
Pan American Games medalists in judo
Pan American Games bronze medalists for Canada
Medalists at the 2011 Pan American Games
20th-century Canadian women
21st-century Canadian women